Sanda Mallam Oumarou (6 November 1982 – May 2021) was a Cameroonian professional footballer who played as a midfielder for Coton Sport and Egyptian club Al Masry SC.

Biography
Oumarou first played for Coton Sport FC de Garoua, with whom he reached the final of the 2003 CAF Cup.

He played for Egyptian club Al Masry SC between 2005 and 2007.

After returning to Coton Sport he helped the club to the final of the 2008 CAF Champions League.

He retired from playing in 2012 and became the coach of Cameroonian second-tier side Université FC de Ngaoundéré.

He died in May 2021 aged 38 after a long illness.

Honours
Cotonsport Garoua
 CAF Champions League: runners-up 2008
 CAF Cup: 2003

References

1982 births
2021 deaths
Association football midfielders
Cameroonian footballers
Egyptian Premier League players
Kadji Sports Academy players
Coton Sport FC de Garoua players
Al Masry SC players
People from Ngaoundéré